Coco Chanel & Igor Stravinsky is a 2009 French romantic drama film directed by Jan Kounen. It was chosen as the Closing Film of the 2009 Cannes Film Festival, and was shown on 24 May 2009.

Coco Chanel & Igor Stravinsky is based on the 2002 fictional novel Coco and Igor by Chris Greenhalgh and traces a rumoured affair between Coco Chanel and Igor Stravinsky in Paris in 1920, the year that Chanel No. 5 was created. Greenhalgh also wrote the screenplay for the film. Chanel and its former chief designer Karl Lagerfeld lent their support to the production; they granted access to the company's archives and to Coco Chanel's apartment at 31, rue Cambon, Paris.

Plot
An introductory scene takes place in Paris in 1913, where Coco Chanel attends the first, scandalous performance of Igor Stravinsky's The Rite of Spring. The rhythmic and harmonic dissonance of the score and the surprising choreography of the piece result in heckling and outrage among much of the audience. But Chanel is impressed by Stravinsky and his music.

Seven years later, Chanel and Stravinsky meet again. Although her business has flourished, Chanel is mourning the death of her lover, Arthur "Boy" Capel. Stravinsky has chosen to flee to France following the Russian Revolution. An immediate sympathy and attraction occurs between the couturière and the composer.

Chanel invites Stravinsky to live in her villa outside Paris, along with his ailing wife and their children. The summer months that follow see Chanel and Stravinsky begin an affair, one which Stravinsky's wife cannot avoid becoming aware of. Tensions between Stravinsky and his wife, and between Stravinsky's wife and Chanel, are unavoidable.

The film implies that the affair, and the later termination of the affair by Chanel, has a major influence on the lives of both Chanel and Stravinsky. It is during this time that Chanel creates Chanel No. 5 with her perfumer, Ernest Beaux, and that Stravinsky begins to compose in a new, more liberated style. During his time at the villa, he works hard on a revision of The Rite of Spring. One of the last scenes of the movie shows the revival of the ballet, with new choreography, and this time, shows that it was an artistic triumph and recognized as a masterpiece.

Cast
 Mads Mikkelsen as Igor Stravinsky
 Anna Mouglalis as Coco Chanel
 Elena Morozova as Catherine Stravinsky
 Natacha Lindinger as Misia Sert
 Grigori Manoukov as Sergei Diaghilev
 Rasha Bukvic as Grand Duke Dmitri
 Erick Demarestz as The Doctor
 Nicolas Vaude as Ernest Beaux
 Anatole Taubman as Boy Capel
 Maxime Danielou as Theodore
 Sophie Hasson as Ludmila
 Nikita Ponomarenko as Soulima Stravinsky
 Clara Guelblum as Milene
 Olivier Claverie as Joseph
 Catherine Davenier as Marie
 Marek Kossakowski as Vaslav Nijinsky
 Jérôme Pillement as Pierre Monteux
 David Tomaszewski as Principal Violinist
 Marek Tomaszewski as Pianist
 Anton Yakovlev as Piotr
 Irina Vavilova as The Governess
 Julie Farenc Deramond as Julie the salesgirl
 Emy Levy and Sarah Jérôme as Workshop girls
 Tina Sportolaro as Beaux's secretary
 Michel Ruhl as The Baron
 Pierre Chidyvar, Agnès Vikouloff and Sacha Vikouloff as Russian musicians
 David Baschung as The Doctor
 Cyril Accorsi, Matthieu Bajolet, Caroline Baudouin, Bruno Benne, Jonathan Ber, Laura Biasse, Barbara Caillieu, Marie-Laure Caradec, Damien Dreux, Sophie Gérard, Patrick Harlay, Inès Hernandez, Anne Laurent, Thibaud Le Maguer, Anne Lenglet, Olivier Normand, Florent Otello, Edouard Pelleray, Judith Perron, Pascal Queneau, Enora Rivère, Julie Salgues, Jonathan Schatz, Wu Zheng (dancers in The Rite of Spring)

Reception
Reviews were mixed. Stephen Holden of The New York Times said the film was "cool, elegant and sexy…. But the film … never regains that initial blast of energy and the final scenes wobble toward a wishy-washy ending."  Writing for DVD Talk, Casey Burchby praises the "extraordinarily bold" opening sequence that recreates the Paris premiere of Stravinsky's The Rite of Spring.

Modestas Mankus from Our Culture Mag gave the film 3/5 stars saying "stumbled through its unclear presentation but gave us a look into the world of two greats."

Historical context

The riotous premiere of The Rite of Spring at the Théâtre des Champs-Élysées on 29 May 1913 is legendary (see: The Rite of Spring#Premiere).

In the spring of 1920, Chanel was introduced to Stravinsky by Sergei Diaghilev, impresario of the Ballets Russes. During the summer, Chanel discovered that the Stravinsky family was seeking a place to live. She invited them to her new home, "Bel Respiro," in the Paris suburb of Garches until they could find a more suitable residence. They arrived at "Bel Respiro" during the second week of September and remained until May 1921. Chanel also guaranteed the 1920 Ballets Russes production of The Rite of Spring against financial loss with an anonymous gift to Diaghilev, said to be 300,000 francs.

The personal relationships depicted in the film are largely fictionalized. Stravinsky was reputed to have been a philanderer who had several affairs, including one with Chanel. Whereas Stravinsky never publicly referred to this alleged affair, Chanel spoke about it at length to her biographer Paul Morand in 1946 (the conversation was published thirty years later as l'Allure de Chanel). The accuracy of Chanel's claims has been disputed both by Stravinsky's second wife, Vera, and by his close musical collaborator, Robert Craft.  The Chanel fashion house avers there is no evidence that any affair between Chanel and Stravinsky ever occurred.

See also
Coco Before Chanel, 2009 film by Anne Fontaine

References

External links
 
 Interview with Anna Mouglalis, VOGUE.COM, July 2010

2009 films
2000s French-language films
Films about fashion designers
Films about classical music and musicians
Films about composers
Films based on British novels
French romantic drama films
French biographical films
French historical romance films
Films directed by Jan Kounen
Films set in Paris
Films shot in Paris
Films set in the 1910s
Films set in the 1920s
Sony Pictures Classics films
Cultural depictions of Igor Stravinsky
Cultural depictions of Coco Chanel
2009 in fashion
Films scored by Gabriel Yared
2000s English-language films
2000s French films